Julian Barratt Pettifer (born 4 May 1968) is an English comedian, actor and musician. As a comedian and comic actor, he is known for his use of surreal humour and black comedy. During the 2000s he was part of The Mighty Boosh comedy troupe alongside comedy partner Noel Fielding.

Born in Leeds, West Yorkshire, Barratt was educated at the University of Reading. With Fielding, he established the Mighty Boosh. Together, they produced a 2001 radio series, The Boosh, for BBC Radio London. This was followed by a television series, The Mighty Boosh, comprising three series for BBC 3 from 2004 to 2007. The show generated a cult fan following and won a variety of awards.

Alongside Fielding, he has starred in Unnatural Acts, Nathan Barley and Garth Marenghi's Darkplace. Barratt also co-wrote and starred in the 2017 film Mindhorn. He starred in the Channel 4 black comedy-drama sitcom Flowers.

Early life
Barratt was born Julian Barratt Pettifer on 4 May 1968 in Leeds, West Yorkshire. He adopted his middle name as his surname to distinguish himself from reporter Julian Pettifer.
He attended the University of Reading.

Career

Film and television

The Mighty Boosh

Barratt stars as the character Howard Moon opposite Noel Fielding's Vince Noir in the comedy series The Mighty Boosh. Howard labels himself a "jazz maverick" and claims to be a multitalented intellectual, calling himself a "man of action", but he is actually unsuccessful in his literary and romantic ventures. He is unpopular with many of the characters, including Mrs. Gideon (who always forgets his name), Bob Fossil (who often uses Howard as a puppet for his bizarre schemes), and Bollo (who often says his name wrongly or ignores him completely). Barratt composed all of the music for the series, which includes a variety of genres such as rap, heavy metal, and psychedelic rock.

Other
Barratt has had parts in other dramas, often alongside his Mighty Boosh partner Noel Fielding. He starred as Dan Ashcroft, a frustrated magazine writer, in the Channel 4 media satire Nathan Barley, and appeared in the surrealistic black comedy series Asylum alongside Simon Pegg and Jessica Stevenson (who wrote and starred in Spaced). The character of Brian Topp in Spaced was written for Barratt, but eventually went to Mark Heap. Barratt played Jackson, a musician, in How Not to Live Your Life. He starred in the "Freelance Scientist" commercial for Metz alcopop. He appeared as The Padre in the spoof horror series Garth Marenghi's Darkplace. He also starred in (and was a writer for) the 1998 sketch show Unnatural Acts, alongside Fielding. Before this, Barratt was one half of an experimental comedy duo called "The Pod" with friend Tim Hope, in which they billed themselves as a "Cyberdance Collective". During this time he also appeared in the 2001 film Lucky Break.

Barratt made his directing début for Warp Films with theatre director Dan Jemmett. Curtains is set in a Norfolk seaside town. It is a dark comedy about a Punch and Judy man. In 2012, Barratt directed his first music video, for the song "All of Me" by Tanlines. He can be heard as the voiceover on many adverts, such as More Th>n Car, House and Pet insurance, and the Directgov advert. He appeared in the music video for Mint Royale's "Blue Song", alongside Noel Fielding, Nick Frost, and Michael Smiley. In 2010, Barratt took part in Sky Comedy's Little Crackers. He wrote and directed a 15-minute film based on his teen band, Satan's Hoof. On 12 March 2011, he made a brief appearance as Heathcliff in Noel Fielding's "Wuthering Heights" dance on the Let's Dance for Comic Relief finale. He also narrated the 2011 documentary Seven Dwarves.

In 2012, Barratt appeared in the miniseries Treasure Island on Sky1, as well as narrating the BBC Two documentary The Tube. He also had a part as an art teacher in the BBC drama White Heat. In 2013, he appeared in the fifth series of Being Human, playing a werewolf named Larry Chrysler. He also narrated the BBC Two documentaries The Route Masters: Running London's Roads and The Fifteen Billion Pound Railway. In April 2014, he collaborated with Julia Davis and Joe Frank on Frank's radio show "Isolation," which was broadcast as part of KCRW's UnFictional series.

In April 2016, he starred as Maurice Flowers, a children's author battling depression, in the Channel 4 series, Flowers, a 6 part dark comedy mini series which follows the eccentric and dysfunctional members of the Flowers family. He reprised the role for the second series in 2018.

He plays the title character in the film Mindhorn, which he co-wrote with Simon Farnaby. It was released through Netflix on 12 May 2017.

Stage
From 3 June to 9 July 2011, Barratt played the Mayor in a production of Nikolai Gogol's classic comedy The Government Inspector at the Young Vic Theatre. In October 2012, he returned to the stage in Lucy Kirkwood's play NSFW at the Royal Court.

Music
Barratt is an accomplished musician, and played guitar for Little Chief during their European tour. He took an interest in jazz fusion at a young age, and by 17 was attempting to launch a career as a professional jazz guitarist. He was in a band called Groove Solution in the early 1990s with Dave Westlake, and has also played bass with Chris Corner in IAMX.

Personal life
Barratt is in a relationship with comedian Julia Davis. Their twin sons, Arthur and Walter, were born on 25 June 2007. In 2010, they performed together in a production of Chekhov's The Bear for Sky Arts 2 and in Sally4Ever, which Davis also wrote and directed. Barratt is known to be shy, quiet and self-deprecating. Unlike his comedy partner Noel Fielding, he prefers not to appear on comedy quiz shows or make similar public appearances, stating that he would rather "stay at home with a good book".

Filmography

Film

Television

Stage

Awards
 2022 The Great nominated Outstanding Performance by an Ensemble Cast in a Comedy Series 28th Screen Actors Guild Awards.
 2019 Killing Eve nominated Best Guest Actor in a Drama Series Online Film and Television Awards, Killing Eve 2018.
 2016 Mindhorn nominated Best Debut Screenwriter British Independent Film Awards 2016.
 2014 ABCs of Death 2 nominated Audience Choice Award Chicago International Film Festival.
 2010  The Mighty Boosh won Best Live Show with Future Sailors at the Shockwaves NME Awards 2010.
 2009 The Mighty Boosh won Best TV Show at the Shockwaves NME Awards 2009
 2008 The Mighty Boosh won Best TV Show at the Shockwaves NME Awards 2008.
 2007 The Mighty Boosh won Best TV Show at the Shockwaves NME Awards 2007.
 2001 The Boosh, first on London Live, then on Radio 4.
 2000 Arctic Boosh won the Barry Award at the Melbourne International Comedy Festival
 1999 Perrier nominee with Noel Fielding as Arctic Boosh
 1998 Perrier Best Newcomer winner with Noel Fielding as the double act The Mighty Boosh
 1995 Won BBC New Comedy Award
 1995 Won Open Mic Award, Edinburgh

References

External links

 
 PBJ Artist Page
 The Guardian interviews Julian Barratt

1968 births
Living people
20th-century English comedians
20th-century English male actors
21st-century English comedians
21st-century English male actors
Alumni of the University of Reading
British surrealist artists
English composers
English jazz guitarists
English male comedians
English male film actors
English male stage actors
English male television actors
English male writers
Male actors from Leeds